Bright Green is a progressive UK politics blog primarily edited by members of the Scottish Greens and the Green Party of England and Wales.

Regular contributors include former MSP Mark Ballard, Maggie Chapman, Peter McColl, Adam Ramsay, Gary Dunion and Sarah Beattie-Smith.

In 2011 McColl was voted the UK's top Green blogger for his contributions to Bright Green.

The blog was listed in the top 100 political blogs by Total Politics in 2011.

Bright Green contributors are active in Scottish and UK politics beyond the website, hosting discussions and workshops at events and conferences such as the 2012 Radical Independence Campaign national conference.

References

External links 
Bright Green website

Bright green environmentalism
British political blogs
Green Party of England and Wales
Organisations based in Edinburgh
Progressivism in the United Kingdom
Republicanism in the United Kingdom
Scottish Green Party
Scottish independence
Scottish republicanism